The Hub on Causeway is a  mixed-use development in West End, Boston adjoining the TD Garden and North Station, and on the site of Boston Garden, which was razed in 1998. Before its construction, the former Garden footprint served as employee parking. As of March 1, 2022, two towers built as part of the development are among the tallest buildings in Boston.

Construction 
Construction was performed in three phases, labeled as The Boston Garden Phase I, II, and III. Phase I improved or expanded North Station and the TD Garden and created buildings described as podiums that later phases built upon. Phase II added a residential tower, hotel, and retail area, and Phase III added an office tower.

Buildings 
The office tower is anchored by Verizon Communications. It also features the global headquarters of Rapid7.

The 440-unit luxury residential tower opened in November 2019.

The Hub Hall is a commercial area that opened with 18 food vendors in late 2021. Notable vendors include celebrity chef Masaharu Morimoto's first restaurant in New England, Momosan Ramen.

The 10-story, 272-room hotel CitizenM Boston North Station opened as part of Phase II construction.

ArcLight Cinema opened a 15-theatre venue in November 2019, but all locations were permanently closed due to the economic impact of the COVID-19 pandemic. In December 2022, AMC Theatres acquired the lease to the location and announced it would reopen as part of the AMC chain in the spring of 2023.

The  Star Market located below the ground level of The Hub on Causeway is the largest grocery store in Boston by area.

References 

Skyscrapers in Boston
Buildings and structures completed in 2021
West End, Boston